Horace Pitt-Rivers may refer to:
 Horace Pitt-Rivers, 3rd Baron Rivers, British nobleman and gambler
 Horace Pitt-Rivers, 6th Baron Rivers, British peer and army officer